Mick Dawson (born in June 1964 in Boston, Lincolnshire, England) is a former Royal Marine Commando, film maker, professional sailor and adventurer. He is best known for rowing the Pacific Ocean with friend and fellow ocean rower Chris Martin in a new state of the art vessel, Bojangles, which Mick built. In 2009, they completed their  voyage in 189 days 10 hours and 55 minutes; a world first and earning a place in the Guinness Book of records.

Rowing 

Pairs Atlantic Crossing in 2001 with his brother Steve. 
Completed in 70 days 10 hours and 12 minutes.

Solo North Pacific attempt in 2003 
Mick made his first attempt to row the Pacific Ocean solo in 2003, ended when his rudder was torn off, in severe weather, and he had to return to Japan after 12 days.

Solo North Pacific attempt in 2004 

Pairs Atlantic Crossing in 2005 with Andrew Morris. 
Mick worked for the Atlantic Rowing Race organisers as a rowing consultant and safety skipper for the 2005. It was here he came to the rescue of an injured Andrew Morris and went on to complete a second crossing of the Atlantic at his side. Completed in 61 days 2 hours and 50 minutes.

Pairs North Pacific Crossing in 2009 with Chris Martin 
The boat was one of the most advanced ocean rowing vessels ever made. Unfortunately, after months at sea and several days of adverse weather and increasing fatigue, the decision was made to resupply before their contingency ran out completely, as they hoped they would have enough supplies to make it to San Francisco unsupported. Mick and Chris completed their journey from Choshi in Japan to San Francisco on the 13November 2009 at 16:00 GMT. They were greeted by their families and a flotilla of boats as they passed the finish line under the Golden Gate Bridge in San Francisco. They completed the  voyage in 189 days 10 hours and 55 minutes.

Mick and Chris also raised money for two charities, one based in the United Kingdom and one based in Nigeria. The first is the Hearts of Gold Children's Hospice. The second charity is Hamilton Lodge School for Deaf Children.

Pairs Crossing of the Pacific; California to Hawaii 2018 

Mick returned to the Pacific in 2018 to take part in the Great Pacific Race from Monterey Bay to Hawaii in 2018. He rowed with Steve 'Sparky' Sparkes. The pair completed the race in 82 days, 16 hours and 54 minutes coming first in the pairs category and third overall in a highly eventful race. When the pair stepped ashore at Waikiki Yacht club 'Sparky' (Also a former Royal Marine Commando) became the first 'Blind' person to row the Pacific Ocean.

Discovery Channel charted Mick's and Chris' voyage in the documentary 'Rowing The Pacific.'

Business career 
Mick is a published author having written two books about his adventures in ocean rowing and working with recovering veterans. His first book; published in the U.S.A. in 2017 is called Battling the Oceans in a Rowboat and in the U.K. it's published under the title; Rowing the Pacific 

His second book entitled; 'Never Leave A Man Behind,' which covers his work with recovering veterans and his row with blind veteran 'Sparky' across the Pacific in 2018 was published in July 2020.

Mick is also an accomplished speaker and works regularly; online and at live events, with companies and corporations across the globe. Giving insights into the ethos of great teamwork, achieving goals and adaptive leadership using his many ocean rowing adventures as a dramatic backdrop to illustrate his points.

References 

1964 births
English male rowers
20th-century Royal Marines personnel
Living people